is a Japanese manga artist who writes primarily yonkoma manga.

Works
Ann 2-sai, Omutsu ha Zushi Taisakisen
Persia ga Suki!
Mama Loves the Poyopoyo-Saurus
Odoron Angel
Takako Aonuma no Madame Hanako
Tanpopo-chan
It Buries and Is the Fruit

External links
 
 Hatena Diary

1960 births
Living people
Manga artists
People from Hakodate